The Catholic University in Erbil (CUE) is a private non-profit institution of higher education and research located in the Erbil suburb of Ankawa, Kurdistan Region

It was founded in December 2015 by the Kurdistan Regional Government Archbishop Bashar Warda of the Chaldean Catholic Church, and provides degrees in the arts and sciences recognized by the Kurdistan Regional Government.

Its foundation stone was laid on 20 October 2012. 30,000 square metres of land were made available for the campus. The Italian Episcopal Conference gave 2.3 million euros for the project, and the Holy Spirit University of Kaslik in Lebanon was contacted for help and guidance.

CUE welcomes students of all cultures, faiths, and backgrounds to study in an environment of coexistence, respect, multiculturalism, academic excellence, promoting quality, individual dignity, and justice.

CUE is an open academic community, based in the best tradition of higher education, dedicated to forming the next generation of leaders to serve with professional excellence in Kurdistan, Iraq and internationally, for the common good, and the dignity of the human person.
As a member of the worldwide community of Catholic University, CUE will be able to introduce its students to some of the finest scholars in the world who will regularly be present as professors and teachers here on the CUE campus.
CUE students will also have the ability to communicate and participate virtually with our partner universities in Australia, USA and Europe.

Academic programs 
 International relations
 English language
 Information technology
 Computer sciences
 Accounting
 Architecture
 Civil engineering
 Medical laboratory sciences
 Pharmacy
 Nursing
 Digital media
 Business management
 Economics
 Oriental studies

References

External links
 Official website

Universities in Kurdistan Region (Iraq)
Catholic universities and colleges in Asia
Private universities and colleges
Educational institutions established in 2015
2015 establishments in Iraq
Erbil
Ankawa
Catholic Church in Iraq